The second season of SuperStar, premiered live on Rede Globo on Sunday, April 12, 2015 at 11:30 p.m. (BRT) and 10:30 p.m. (AMT) during the 2015–16 Brazilian television season. 
The winning band was entitled to a R$ 500,000 prize, a brand new Ford Ka and a recording contract with Som Livre.

Host and experts

Hosts
Fernanda Lima and André Marques returned as the hosts, while actress Fernanda Paes Leme was replaced by TV host Rafa Brites as backstage interviewer.

Experts
The entire panel was replaced from the first season. RPM frontman and musician Paulo Ricardo, Latin Grammy Award–nominee singer and actress Sandy and pagode singer-songwriter Thiaguinho were the three experts for this season.

The auditions
 Key
  – Expert vote "Yes"
  – Expert vote "No"
  – Band joined this expert's team by choice
  – Band joined this expert's team by default
  – Band reached + 70%, finished in the top 5 and advanced to SuperPass
  – Band reached + 70%, finished out the top 5 and was sent to Wild Card
  – Band eliminated

Week 1
Aired: April 12, 2015
Running order

Week 2
Aired: April 19, 2015
Running order

Week 3
Aired: April 26, 2015
Running order

Week 4
Aired: May 3, 2015
Running order

Week 5
Aired: May 10, 2015
Running order

SuperPass 
Key
  – Saved by expert
  – Band eliminated

Week 6 
Aired: May 17, 2015
Running order

Week 7 
Aired: May 24, 2015
Running order

Week 8 
Aired: May 31, 2015
Running order

SuperFilter

Week 9
Aired: June 7, 2015
Running order

Week 10 
Aired: June 14, 2015
Running order

The solos

Elimination chart

Week 11 
Top 12
Aired: June 21, 2015
Running order

Week 12 
Top 9
Aired: June 28, 2015
Running order

Week 13 
Top 7
Aired: July 5, 2015
Running order

Week 14
Top 4
Aired: July 12, 2015
Running order

Ratings and reception

Brazilian ratings
All numbers are in points and provided by IBOPE.

 In 2015, each point represents 67.000 households in São Paulo.

References

External links
SuperStar on GShow.com

Rising Star (franchise)
2015 Brazilian television seasons